Tulsen Paul Tollett (born 6 May 1973) is a TV presenter and former professional rugby league footballer who played in the 1990s and 2000s. A Great Britain international representative utility back, he played in Australia for Sydney's Penrith Panthers (Heritage № 320) and the Parramatta Eels (Heritage № 513) clubs, before moving to England and playing for the London Broncos (Heritage № 301).

Background
Tollett was born in Hastings, Sussex in the United Kingdom, but moved with his family to Australia as a youngster. His junior career was with Emu Plains JRLC prior to being signed by Penrith.

Rugby league career
Tollett played at the Penrith Panthers and the Parramatta Eels before joining the Broncos for the 1996 inaugural season of Super League I. He played his junior football for Emu Plains.

After a successful first season in England, he was selected for the Great Britain squad to tour Papua New Guinea, Fiji and New Zealand.

Tollett's highlights with the Broncos include:

Playing in the side that beat top Australian side Canberra Raiders in Super League's World Club Championship series in 1997 (London Broncos chalked up a rare win by a Super League side against their Australasian Super League counterparts in that year's competition)
Being part of the first London Broncos side to reach a Rugby League Challenge Cup final, in 1999 against the Leeds Rhinos at Wembley
Being in the highest finishing London side (second, Super League 1997) in the club's (Fulham, London Crusaders, Broncos) history to date

Rugby union career
Tollett also had spells in rugby union with English Premiership side Harlequins during 1997/98, as well as London Welsh in 1999/2000 during the Rugby League close season.

Media work
Tollett was forced to give up playing in 2001 due to a persistent shoulder injury. He then moved into the media and now presents sport on BBC World News and the BBC News Channel. Previous to this he worked for ABC News 24 - now ABC News channel and ABC NewsRadio - now ABC News on radio in Sydney and has also worked for BBC Radio 5 Live, Sky Sports, Eurosport and Setanta Sports amongst others as a presenter, reporter or commentator, and worked as a pitchside reporter for TVH, the host broadcaster at the 2007 Rugby World Cup in France.

In 2021, Tollett was a commentator for Channel 4's coverage of the 2020 Paralympics.

Qualifications
Tollett holds a Bachelor of Physical Education teaching degree, as well as a first dan karate black belt.

References

External links
London Broncos profile
(archived by web.archive.org) Statistics: Tulsen Tollett Rugby Premiership

1973 births
Living people
BBC sports presenters and reporters
English male karateka
English rugby league players
English rugby union players
English television presenters
Harlequin F.C. players
London Broncos players
London Welsh RFC players
Parramatta Eels players
Penrith Panthers players
Rugby league centres
Rugby league five-eighths
Rugby league fullbacks
Rugby league halfbacks
Rugby league players from East Sussex
Rugby league wingers
Rugby union players from East Sussex
Sportspeople from Hastings